The Secretary of Natural and Historic Resources is a member of the Virginia Governor's Cabinet. It was established in 1986 after splitting from the state Secretary of Commerce (then called the Secretary of Commerce and Resources).

List of Secretaries of Natural Resources

Secretary of Natural Resources (July 1986–present)
 John W. Daniel II (1986–1990)
 Elizabeth H. Haskell (1990–1994)
 Becky Norton Dunlop (1994–1998)
 John Paul Woodley Jr. (1998–2001)
 Ron Hamm (2001–2002)
 W. Tayloe Murphy Jr. (2002–2006)
 Preston Bryant (2006–2010)
 Douglas Domenech (2010–2014)
 Molly Joseph Ward (2014–2018)
 Matt Strickler (2018–2021)
 Ann Jennings (2021–2022)
 Andrew R. Wheeler (2022)
 Travis Voyles (acting; 2022–present)

References

External links
 Secretary of Natural Resources

1986 establishments in Virginia
Government agencies established in 1986
Natural Resources
Natural Resources